Gary Reed (born 25 October 1981) is a Canadian retired middle distance runner. On September 2, 2007, he won the silver medal in the 2007 World Championships in Athletics in Osaka, Japan, with a time of 1.47.10. Reed was born in Corpus Christi, Texas,  and currently resides in Kamloops, British Columbia.

Reed announced his retirement from competitive athletics December 13, 2010, at only 29 years old. He retires as the former 800-metre Canadian record holder, a six-time Canadian Champion (2009, 2008, 2007, 2005, 2004, 2003), and a Team Canada member at two Olympics (2004, 2008) and Six World Championships (2001, 2003,(2004 Indoor)2005, 2007, 2009). His best performances include a silver medal at the 2007 World Championships and a 4th-place finish at the 2008 Olympic Games in Beijing, China.

See also
 Canadian records in track and field

External links
 
 Gary Reed's profile on the Athletics Canada website

References

1981 births
Living people
Canadian male middle-distance runners
Olympic track and field athletes of Canada
Athletes (track and field) at the 2004 Summer Olympics
Athletes (track and field) at the 2008 Summer Olympics
Athletes (track and field) at the 2006 Commonwealth Games
Sportspeople from British Columbia
Canadian people of American descent
Black Canadian track and field athletes
People from Corpus Christi, Texas
World Athletics Championships medalists
Commonwealth Games competitors for Canada